Dunford is a civil parish in the metropolitan borough of Barnsley, South Yorkshire, England.  The parish contains 23 listed buildings that are recorded in the National Heritage List for England.   All the listed buildings are designated at Grade II, the lowest of the three grades, which is applied to "buildings of national importance and special interest".  The parish is almost completely rural, containing only small settlements, including Carlecotes.  Most of the listed buildings are farmhouses, farm buildings, and houses.  The other listed buildings are a church, animal shelters, a boundary stone, a wayside cross, and milestones.


Buildings

References

Citations

Sources

 

Lists of listed buildings in South Yorkshire
Buildings and structures in the Metropolitan Borough of Barnsley